is a Japanese surname.

Notable people 
 , Japanese actress
 , Japanese volleyball player
 , Japanese actress and model
 , former Japanese ambassador to the United States
 , Japanese Baseball player
 , Japanese football player

Japanese-language surnames